Rose R. Terlin (24 October 1908 – 17 June 1979) was an American Christian leader, economist, author of several books on religion and economic justice and a YWCA leader. During and after World War II (1939–45) she held various senior government positions.

Life

Rose R. Terlin was born in San Francisco in 1908.
She studied at the University of California at Berkeley, where she gained a master's degree in economics.
The Fellowship of Socialist Christians was organized in the early 1930s by Reinhold Niebuhr and others with similar views.
Later it changed its name to Frontier Fellowship and then to Christian Action.
Rose Terlin was one of the main supporters of the Fellowship in the early days, as were Eduard Heimann, Sherwood Eddy and Paul Tillich. 
In its early days the group thought capitalist individualism was incompatible with Christian ethics.
Although not Communist, the group acknowledged Karl Marx's social philosophy.

Terlin wrote about the connection between religion and economic justice.
In her 1936 You and I and the Movies she noted that in typical labor films like Black Fury or Riff-Raff it is taken for granted that there is "no cause for the strike save personal animosities or someone's personal ambition."
Hollywood would very rarely blame a business for giving cause to strike.
In her Christian Faith and Social Action (1940) she wrote, 

As Economic Secretary for the YWCA National Association, and later as Editor of the YWCA Woman's Press, Terlin was often attacked for her views.
On 9 October 1939 a witness told the Dies Committee that Terlin was a member of the Young Communist League and that she had attended the national training school run by the Communist Party.
Terlin denied this in a sworn affidavit, but the charge was often brought up as evidence that the YWCA had been infiltrated by Communists.

In her affidavit Terlin stated  that she had only just returned to the US on 1 October 1939 after spending two years in Geneva, Switzerland, working for the World Student Christian Federation (WSCF), and was now Economics Secretary of the National Board of the YWCA USA.
Terlin was a member of the national board of the YWCA USA from 1939 to 1943, and was also director of social and economic studies of the WSCF in Geneva.
In August 1942 she was among the signatories of Christians for Victory: A statement by American Christian Leaders to their Fellow-Christians on the Moral and Spiritual Issues at Stake in the Outcome of the War. It opened with the assertion, "This war must be won by the United Nations."
She joined the National War Labor Board, where she was appointed head of the white collar section in the New York area.

Terlin became a supporter of the Committee for a Democratic Far Eastern Policy.
The American YWCA Secretaries Talitha Gerlach and Lily Haass, who had both worked in China, were also supporters.
After leaving the War Labor Board Terlin was editor-in-chief of the YWCA USA's Women's Press and of the Whiteside Press in New York.
She was director of public relations for the YWCA in Pittsburgh from 1955 to 1960.
She moved to Washington, D.C. in 1960 and joined the Department of Labor's Women's Bureau, where she became a senior economist.
In 1965 as chief of the Employment Opportunities Branch of the US Department of Labor she talked about the revolution that was occurring in the pattern of women's lives, with longer lives and the need for two paychecks to pay for "the greater variety of goods and services considered essential to meet the American standard of living." She said girls, "must be helped early in their teens to prepare them for the dual role of homemakers and workers."

Terlin retired in 1975. 
She died of cancer on 17 June 1979, aged 71, at the Washington Home Hospice.

Publications

Notes

Sources

1908 births
1979 deaths
YWCA leaders
20th-century American economists